Mold (American English) or mould (British English), also sometimes referred to as mildew, is a fungal growth that develops on wet materials. Mold is a natural part of the environment and plays an important part in nature by breaking down dead organic matter such as fallen leaves and dead trees; indoors, mold growth should be avoided. Mold reproduces by means of tiny spores. The spores are like seeds, but invisible to the naked eye, that float through the air and deposit on surfaces. When the temperature, moisture, and available nutrient conditions are correct, the spores can form into new mold colonies where they are deposited. There are many types of mold, but all require moisture and a food source for growth.

Health effects

Mold is ubiquitous, and mold spores are a common component of household and workplace dust. In large amounts they can lead to mold health issues to humans, potentially causing allergic reactions and respiratory diseases.

Mycotoxins 
Some mold produce mycotoxins, chemical components of their cell walls, that can pose serious health risks to humans and animals. "Toxic mold" refers to mold which produce mycotoxins, such as Stachybotrys chartarum. Exposure to high levels of mycotoxins can lead to neurological disorders and death. Prolonged exposure (for example, on a daily basis) can be particularly harmful. Mycotoxins can persist in the indoor environment even after death of the fungi. They can adhere to dust particles and can spread through the air attached to these dust particles or spores. There must be very specific temperature and humidity conditions in order for fungi to produce mycotoxins.

Symptoms
Symptoms of mold exposure may include nasal congestion; sinusitis; rhinorrhea, eye irritation; respiratory difficulties, such as wheezing, chest pain, cough, and persistent sneezing; throat irritation; skin irritation, such as a rash; and headache. Immunocompromised people and people with chronic lung illnesses, such as obstructive lung disease, may get serious infections in their lungs when they are exposed to mold. These people should stay away from areas that are likely to have mold, such as compost piles, cut grass, and wooded areas.

Asthma 
Infants may develop respiratory symptoms as a result of exposure to Penicillium, a fungal genus. Signs of mold-related respiratory problems in an infant include a persistent cough or wheeze. Increased exposure increases the probability of developing respiratory symptoms during the first year of life. Studies have indicated a correlation between the probability of developing asthma and exposure to Penicillium.

Mold exposure has a variety of health effects, and sensitivity to mold varies. Exposure to mold may cause throat irritation, nasal stuffiness, eye irritation, cough and wheezing and skin irritation in some cases. Exposure to mold may heighten sensitivity, depending on the time and nature of exposure. People with chronic lung diseases are at higher risk for mold allergies, and will experience more severe reactions when exposed to mold. Damp indoor environments correlate with upper-respiratory-tract symptoms, such as coughing and wheezing in people with asthma.

Causes and growing conditions
Mold is found everywhere and can grow on almost any substance when moisture is present.  It reproduces by spores, which are carried by air currents. When spores land on a moist surface suitable for life, they begin to grow. Mold is normally found indoors at levels that do not affect most healthy individuals.

Because common building materials are capable of sustaining mold growth and mold spores are ubiquitous, mold growth in an indoor environment is typically related to water or moisture exposure and may be caused by incomplete drying of flooring materials (such as concrete). Flooding, leaky roofs, poor building maintenance, or indoor plumbing problems can lead to interior mold growth. Water vapor commonly condenses on surfaces cooler than the moisture-laden air, enabling mold to flourish. This moisture vapor passes through walls and ceilings, typically condensing during the winter in climates with a long heating season. Floors over crawl spaces and basements, without vapor barriers or with dirt floors, are mold-prone. The "doormat test" detects moisture from concrete slabs without a sub-slab vapor barrier. Inorganic materials, such as metal or polished concrete, do not support mold growth, although surface mold growth is still possible.

Significant mold growth requires moisture and food sources and a substrate capable of sustaining growth. Common cellulose-based building materials, such as plywood, drywall, furring strips, finish carpentry, cabinetry, wood framing, composite wood flooring, carpets, and carpet padding provide food for mold. In carpet, organic load such as invisible dust and cellulose are food sources. After water damage to a building, mold grows in walls and then becomes dormant until subsequent high humidity; suitable conditions reactivate mold. Mycotoxin levels are higher in buildings which have had a water incident.

Hidden mold 
Mold is detectable by smell and signs of water damage on walls or ceiling and can grow in places invisible to the human eye. It may be found behind wallpaper or paneling, on the inside of dropped ceilings, the back of drywall, or the underside of carpets or carpet padding. Piping in walls may also be a source of mold, since they may leak (causing moisture and condensation).

Spores need three things to grow into mold: nutrients – cellulose (the cell wall of green plants) is a common food for indoor spores; moisture – to begin the decaying process caused by mold; and time – mold growth begins from 24 hours to 10 days after the provision of growing conditions.

Mold colonies can grow inside buildings, and the chief hazard is the inhalation of mycotoxins. After a flood or major leak, mycotoxin levels are higher – even after a building has dried out.

Food sources for mold in buildings include cellulose-based materials such as wood, cardboard and the paper facing on drywall and organic matter such as soap, textiles, and dust containing skin cells. If a house has mold, the moisture may originate in the basement or crawl space, a leaking roof or a leak in plumbing pipes. Insufficient ventilation may accelerate moisture buildup. Visible mold colonies may form where ventilation is poorest and on perimeter walls (because they are nearest the dew point).

If there are mold problems in a house only during certain times of the year, the house is probably too airtight or too drafty. Mold problems occur in airtight homes more frequently in the warmer months (when humidity is high inside the house, and moisture is trapped), and occur in drafty homes more frequently in the colder months (when warm air escapes from the living area and condenses). If a house is artificially humidified, by the use of a humidifier, during the winter, this can create conditions favorable to mold. Moving air may prevent mold from growing, since it has the same desiccating effect as low humidity.

Removing one of the three requirements for mold reduces (or eliminates) new mold growth: moisture; food for the mold spores (for example, dust or dander); and warmth since mold generally does not grow in cold environments.

Heating, ventilation, and air conditioning (HVAC) systems can produce all three requirements for mold growth. The air conditioning system creates a difference in temperature, encouraging condensation. The high rate of dusty air movement through an HVAC system may furnish ample food for mold. Since the air-conditioning system is not always running, warm conditions are the final component for mold growth.

Assessment 
An observation of the indoor environment should be conducted before any sampling is performed. The area should be surveyed for odors indicating mold or bacterial growth, moisture sources, such as stagnant water or leaking pipes, and water-damaged building materials. This can include moving furniture, lifting (or removing) carpets, checking behind wallpaper or paneling, checking ventilation ductwork and exposing wall cavities. Efforts typically focus on areas where there are signs of liquid moisture or water vapor (humidity), or where moisture problems are suspected. Often, quick decisions about the immediate safety and health of the environment can be made by these observations before sampling is even needed. The United States Environmental Protection Agency (EPA) does not generally recommend sampling unless an occupant of the space has symptoms. In most cases, if visible mold growth is present, sampling is unnecessary. Sampling should be performed by a trained professional with specific experience in mold-sampling protocols, sampling methods and the interpretation of findings. It should be done only to make a particular determination, such as airborne spore concentration or identifying a particular species.

Sampling 
Before sampling, a subsequent course of action should be determined.

In the U.S., sampling and analysis should follow the recommendations of the Occupational Safety and Health Administration (OSHA), National Institute for Occupational Safety and Health (NIOSH), the EPA and the American Industrial Hygiene Association (AIHA). Types of samples include air, surface, bulk, dust, and swab.  Multiple types of sampling are recommended by the AIHA, since each has limitations.

Air sampling 

Air is the most common form of sampling to assess mold levels. Although, the Environmental Protection Agency (EPA) does not have any current testing protocols. Air sampling is considered to be the most representative method for assessing respiratory exposure to mold. Indoor and outdoor air are sampled, and their mold spore concentrations are compared. Indoor mold concentrations should be less than or equal to outdoor concentrations with similar distributions of species. A predominant difference in species or higher indoor concentrations can indicate poor indoor air quality and a possible health hazard. Air sampling can be used to identify hidden mold and is often used to assess the effectiveness of control measures after remediation. An indoor mold air sampling campaign should be performed over the course of at least several days as the environmental conditions can lead to variations in the day-to-day mold concentration. Stationary samplers assess a specific environment, such as a room or building, whereas personal samplers assess the mold exposure one person receives in all of the environments they enter over the course of sampling. Personal samplers can be attached to workers to assess their respiratory exposures to molds on the job. Personal samplers usually show higher levels of exposure than stationary samples due to the "personal cloud" effect, where the activities of the person re-suspend settled particles. There are several methods that can be used for indoor mold air sampling.

Swab and surface sampling 

Surface sampling measures the number of mold spores deposited on indoor surfaces.  With swab, a cotton swab is rubbed across the area being sampled, often a measured area, and subsequently sent to the mold testing laboratory. The swab can rubbed on an agar plate to grow the mold on a growth medium. Final results indicate mold levels and species located in the suspect area. Surface sampling can be used to identify the source of mold exposure. Molecular analyses, such as qPCR, may also be used for species identification and quantification. Swab and surface sampling can give detailed information about the mold, but cannot measure the actual mold exposure because it is not aerosolized.

Bulk and dust sampling 
Bulk removal of material from the contaminated area is used to identify and quantify the mold in the sample. This method is often used to verify contamination and identify the source of contamination. Dust samples can be collected using a vacuum with a collection filter attached. Dust from surfaces such as floors, beds, or furniture is often collected to assess health effects from exposure in epidemiology studies. Researchers of indoor mold also use a long-term settled dust collection system where a dust cloth or a petri dish is left out in the environment for a set period of time, sometimes weeks. Dust samples can be analyzed using culture-based or culture-independent methods. Quantitative PCR is a DNA-based molecular method that can identify and quantify fungal species. The Environmental Relative Moldiness Index (ERMI) is a numerical that can be used in epidemiological studies to assess mold burdens of houses in the United States. The ERMI consists of a list of 36 fungal species commonly associated with damp houses that can be measured using qPCR. Like swab and surface sampling, bulk and dust sampling can give detailed information about the mold source, but cannot accurately determine the level of exposure to the source.

Remediation 

The first step in solving an indoor mold problem is to remove the moisture source; new mold will begin to grow on moist, porous surfaces within 24 to 48 hours. There are a number of ways to prevent mold growth. Some cleaning companies specialize in fabric restoration, removing mold (and mold spores) from clothing to eliminate odor and prevent further damage to garments.

The effective way to clean mold is to use detergent solutions which physically remove mold.  Many commercially available detergents marketed for mold cleanup include an EPA-approved antifungal agent.

Mold will start to grow once moisture and organic material come together. This can happen anywhere in a property including bathrooms, walls, garages, bedrooms, kitchens, etc. A smell is a good indicator that there is mold growth that needs immediate attention. If not attended to, the growth can spread through the property contributing to adverse health problems and causing secondary damage to the structure and its contents. Significant mold growth may require professional mold remediation to remove the affected building materials and eradicate the source of excess moisture. In extreme cases of mold growth in buildings, it may be more cost-effective to condemn the building than to reduce mold to safe levels. 

The goals of remediation are to remove (or clean) contaminated materials, preventing fungi (and fungi-contaminated dust) from entering an occupied (or non-contaminated) area while protecting workers performing the abatement.

Cleanup and removal methods
The purpose of cleanup is to eliminate mold and remove contaminated materials. Killing mold with a biocide is insufficient, since chemical substances and proteins causing reactions in humans remain in dead mold. The following methods are used.
 Evaluation: Before remediation, the area is assessed to ensure safety, clean up the entire moldy area, and properly approach the mold. The EPA provides the following instructions:
 HVAC cleaning: Should be done by a trained professional.
 Protective clothing: Includes a half- or full-face respirator. Goggles with a half-face respirator prevent mold spores from reaching the mucous membranes of the eyes. Disposable hazmat suits are available to keep out particles down to one micrometer, and personal protective equipment keep mold spores from entering skin cuts. Gloves are made of rubber, nitrile, polyurethane, or neoprene.
 Dry brushing or agitation device: Wire brushing or sanding is used when microbial growth can be seen on solid wood surfaces such as framing or underlayment (the subfloor).
 Dry-ice blasting: Removes mold from wood and cement; however, this process may spray mold and its byproducts into surrounding air.
 Wet vacuum: Wet vacuuming is used on wet materials, and this method is one of those approved by the EPA.
 Damp wipe: Removal of mold from non-porous surfaces by wiping or scrubbing with water and a detergent and drying quickly.
 HEPA (high-efficiency particulate air) vacuum cleaner: Used in remediation areas after materials have been dried and contaminated materials removed; collected debris and dust is stored to prevent debris release.
 Debris disposal: Sealed in the remediation area, debris is usually discarded with ordinary construction waste.

Equipment
Equipment used in mold remediation includes:

 Moisture meter to measure drying of damaged materials;
 Humidity gauge, often paired with a thermometer;
 Borescope, a flexible tube with a camera at the end, to illuminate potential mold problems inside walls, ceilings and crawl spaces;
 Digital camera to document findings during evaluation;
 Personal protective equipment (PPE): respirators, gloves, impervious suit, and eye protection;
 Thermographic camera, infrared thermal-imaging cameras to identify secondary moisture sources.
 Hepa Vacuum, also known as High Efficiency Particulate Filter is commonly used with mold remediation for safely removing any mold spores from the surface and building materials to deter these pores from becoming airborne.

Protection levels
During mold remediation in the U.S., the level of contamination dictates the protection level for remediation workers. Contamination levels have been enumerated as I, II, III, and IV:
 Level I: Small, isolated areas ( or less); remediation may be conducted by trained building staff;
 Level II: Mid-sized, isolated areas; may also be remediated by trained, protected building staff;
 Level III: Large, isolated areas: Professionals experienced in microbial investigations or mold remediation should be consulted, and personnel should be trained in the handling of hazardous materials and equipped with respiratory protection, gloves and eye protection;
 Level IV: Extensive contamination (more than ); requires trained, equipped professionals

After remediation, the premises should be reevaluated to ensure success.

Residential mold prevention and control

According to the EPA, residential mold may be prevented and controlled by cleaning and repairing rain gutters, to prevent moisture seepage into the home; keeping air-conditioning drip pans clean and drainage lines clear; monitoring indoor humidity; drying areas of moisture or condensation and removing their sources; ensuring that there is adequate ventilation by installing an exhaust fan in your bathroom; treating exposed structural wood or wood framing with an EPA-approved fungicidal encapsulation coating after pre-cleaning (particularly homes with a crawl space, unfinished basement, or a poorly-ventilated attic).

See also

 Environmental engineering
 Environmental health
 Greenguard Environmental Institute
 High-ozone shock treatment
 House dust mite
 Hurricane response
 Occupational asthma
 Sick building syndrome

Notes

External links
  Environmental Protection Agency Mold Homepage
 

Building biology
Cleaning
Fungi and humans
Industrial hygiene
Occupational safety and health